N. Bongkhao Konyak is a politician from Nagaland. He was elected to the Nagaland Legislative Assembly in 2018 from Tobu Assembly constituency as candidate of Nationalist Democratic Progressive Party. He was appointed the Advisor for Department of Under Developed Areas (DUDA) in Fourth Neiphiu Rio ministry.

Bongkhao did his B.A. at St. Joseph's College, Jakhama and later completed his M.A. in Part-II Political Science from University of Delhi in 1999.

See also
 Tobu (Vidhan Sabha constituency)

References

Nagaland politicians
Living people
1977 births
Nationalist Democratic Progressive Party politicians